Justin Grioli (born 20 September 1987) is a Maltese international footballer who plays for Gudja United, as a right back.

Career
Grioli has played club football for Valletta, Tarxien Rainbows and Balzan.

He made his international debut for Malta in 2014.

References

1987 births
Living people
Maltese footballers
Malta international footballers
Valletta F.C. players
Tarxien Rainbows F.C. players
Balzan F.C. players
Gudja United F.C. players
Maltese Premier League players
Association football fullbacks